Calcott is a village in Shropshire, England. It falls within the civil parish of Bicton.

Villages in Shropshire